The American Society for the Defense of Tradition, Family and Property, also known as The American TFP, and legally incorporated as The Foundation for a Christian Civilization, Inc. is a Catholic American advocacy group. It is an autonomous organization which forms part of the larger anticommunist international Tradition, Family and Property (TFP) movement founded by Brazilian intellectual, politician and activist Plinio Corrêa de Oliveira.

History
Founded in 1973, it is one of many "Tradition, Family and Property" groups (TFPs) and like-minded organizations worldwide, all of which are inspired by the work of the Brazilian intellectual, politician and activist Plinio Corrêa de Oliveira. The first American group was incorporated in 1975, and established its first hermitage in 1977 in Yonkers, New York. The Yonkers location was subsequently closed, with the hermits establishing their permanent hermitage on 70 acres in Spring Grove, Pennsylvania.

The Foundation for a Christian Civilization ("Foundation") was incorporated in 1973, drawing on earlier ties between Brazilians, who traveled to the US to develop a North American affiliate.  The American TFP developed early connections with leaders of the religious and political right, including Paul Weyrich of the Heritage Foundation and the Free Congress Foundation and Morton Blackwell of the College Republican National Committee and the Reagan administration.  Founded to help fundraising for a Catholic counterrevolution against communism, it subsequently became a civil cultural organization that aims to uphold and promote the values of Christian civilization. The Foundation later merged in June 1992 with American TFP to form a single corporation identified as The Foundation for a Christian Civilization.

The American TFP filed a patent on the TFP's Religious habit to stop a Heralds of the Gospel aligned TFP group, Mary Queen of the Third Millenium, from using it, but the court ruled against the American TFP and the Heralds were allowed to continue using the habit in America.

Organization

The organization solicits funds as a non-profit charity, not as a diocesan organization."  Its annual public reports to the Internal Revenue Service indicate that between 2002 and 2014 it disbursed $1,800,000 to support the St. Louis de Montfort Academy and $1,500,000 to support related organizations in North and South America, most significantly Canada Needs Our Lady, Associação dos Fundadores and the Tradición y Acción organizations of Colombia and Peru.

Activities
TFP has continued its ties with the political right as a participating sponsor of the Conservative Political Action Conference, and by signing statements issued by the Heartland Institute that opposed housing finance reform legislation, and discussions of climate change in comprehensive energy legislation and in the State Department funding authorization.

TFP Student Action is the university campus outreach of the TFP. Its activities include distributing fliers and other literature on the streets of universities, sponsoring speakers on campuses, hosting student conferences, and organizing protests and petitions, especially against abortion and LGBT student groups at Catholic universities. Its most recent campaign is against the 96 Catholic colleges and universities that allow LGBT student groups. In April 2009, volunteers of TFP Student Action traveled to the major cities of New Hampshire and Maine to distribute literature against same-sex marriage.

The American TFP provides the staff to run Saint Louis de Montfort Academy, a boys' boarding school in  Herndon, Pennsylvania, that provides students with a traditional Catholic education. It also operates Call to Chivalry summer camps, which express Oliveira's view  of nobility, chivalry, and the benefits of the feudal past.

The Return to Order campaign is an offshoot of the US Foundation for a Christian Civilisation. In 2019, it organized a petition against the Good Omens miniseries as mocking God's wisdom and making Satanism appear normal, light and acceptable, but they targeted the petition at Netflix rather than Amazon Prime Video which distributes the series.  In 2021, they staged a protest at the 59th New York Film Festival due to the festival showing the Paul Verhoeven film Benedetta, which they deemed blasphemous for its portrayal of lesbianism within the confines of a convent.

Criticism 
The American TFP has been cited in several articles by the Southern Poverty Law Center (SPLC) for their anti-LGBTQ views. According to the SPLC the TFP is a "virulently anti-LGBT group".

Jesuit priest James Martin, referring to the American TFP and to the organisation Church Militant commented that “These online hate groups are now more powerful than local churches”.

See also
America Needs Fatima
Alliance Defending Freedom
Catholic League
Christian Institute
Family Research Council

References

External links
 
 America Needs Fatima
 TFP Student Action
 St. Louis de Montfort Academy
 "Foundation for a Christian Civilization, The", Charitable Solicitations Program Charity Profile Report, Washington Secretary of State, Olympia, Washington
 "American Society for the Defense of Tradition, Family and Property", Charity Navigator

Traditionalist Catholicism
Anti-communist organizations in the United States
Intelligent design movement
Political advocacy groups in the United States
Catholic Church in the United States
Organizations established in 1973
1973 establishments in the United States
Organizations that oppose LGBT rights in the United States
Catholic advocacy groups
Conservative organizations in the United States
Tradition, Family, Property